Emmer Green is an electoral ward of the Borough of Reading, in the English county of Berkshire. Until the 2022 Reading Borough Council election, it was known as Peppard ward and had slightly different boundaries.

Extent

The ward is north and north-east of the commercial centre of the suburb of Caversham, namely its Thames and Caversham wards.  It covers all of Emmer Green including wholly residential and smaller 'Caversham Park Village' which is not marked on many maps. It includes a small proportion of Caversham proper, which was until the early 20th century the parish of (and had the main amenities of) Emmer Green.  They have some interdependence to this day, such as in education, voluntary and sporting organisations, small shops and supermarkets.  The proportion of socially rented housing has consistently been lower than the borough average in the 2001 and 2011 censuses and is mentioned in the Emmer Green and Caversham articles.

Councillors
As with all Reading wards, apart from smaller Mapledurham, Peppard ward elects three councillors to Reading Borough Council. As the council is elected by thirds, its three councillors were variously elected in 2011, 2012 and 2014.

These councillors are in order of election: Jane Stanford-Beale, Simon Robinson and Clare Grashoff, who are all Conservatives.

Historic composition
In 2004 the election was held under the previous system adopted by the Borough of 'whole council' elections.  The three councillors were all elected in one election, who were two Liberal Democrats and one Conservative.

In 2006 one of the seats was contested and resulted in the re-election of Mark Ralph for the Conservative Party, who was re-elected four years later.

References

Wards of Reading